Mallsoft (also known as mallwave) is a vaporwave subgenre themed after retro shopping malls.

Overview

Often based on corporate lounge music, it is meant to conjure images of shopping malls, grocery stores, lobbies, and other places of public commerce. Mallsoft artists typically elicit nostalgic memories of these retail establishments, even to those who did not experience them, firsthand through easy listening, bossa nova, and smooth jazz music while providing commentary on consumerism and corporate capitalism. Much of the enjoyment from listeners is derived from nostalgia and the "pleasure of remembering for the sake of the act of remembering itself".

Characteristics
Some artists simply take existing 1980s' pop songs, slow them down, and add reverb as if to make it sound like it's coming from the overhead speakers in an empty or abandoned mall. Reverb and distortion is often overlaid on top of a track to give it an isolating and disorienting feeling. YouTube videos are also made to pair mallsoft tracks with images of malls with an emphasis on selected images that appear to have been taken from the 1980s and 1990s. The visuals can often be meant to invoke a sense of loneliness along with the cold nature of meandering through overly-corporate mercantile environments.

Reception
Music journalist Simon Chandler described Cat System Corp.'s 2014 album Palm Mall as being "perhaps the definitive mallsoft album".

See also 
 Ambient music
 Postmodern architecture
 Dead mall

References 

21st-century music genres
Neologisms
Microgenres
2010s in music
2020s in music
Nostalgia
Shopping malls
Vaporwave
Indie music